Ben Jerrod is an American serial which ran from April 1, 1963 to June 28, 1963. The series is most notable for being the first daytime drama to be regularly televised in color. Michael M. Ryan played the show's title character. The cast also included Addison Richards, Lyle Talbot, Gerald Gordon, and Isabel Randolph.

Production
The show was one of the least-durable soap operas on television. It was created by Roy Winsor and was produced by Joseph Hardy. William Kendall Clark was the writer, and Fred Carney was the director. Ben Jerrod's musical bridges were produced through a guitar and percussion instruments.

Recorded on tape in Hollywood, Ben Jerrod was broadcast from 2 to 2:25 p.m. Eastern Time. It joined with another soap opera, House of Hope, to replace Merv Griffin's program, but its ratings turned out to be lower than Griffin's show. Its competition included Password on CBS and Day in Court on NBC. It was replaced by People Will Talk.

Synopsis
Set in the town of Indian Hill, the series follows two Rhode Island lawyers defending a socialite accused of murdering her husband. John Abbott is a retired judge, and his young assistant, Jerrod, attended Harvard. Abbott's daughter was their "secretary and gal Friday".

Cast
Michael M. Ryan as Ben Jerrod
Addison Richards as John Abbott, Jerrod's older partner
Jeanne Baird as Agnes Abbott, daughter of John Abbott
Lyle Talbot as Lt. Choates
Regina Gleason as Janet Donnelli
Ken Scott as Jim O'Hara, Donnelli's boyfriend
Peter Hansen as druggist Peter Morrison
Martine Bartlett as Lil Morrison, wife of Peter Morrison
Gerald Gordon as Sam Richardson
Denise Alexander as Emily Sanders
William Phipps as Coroner Engle
John Napier as D.A. Dan Joplin
Don Collier as Abel Forsythe
Adele Pike as Jo Helton
Charlotte Stewart as Ingénue
Isabel Randolph
Paul Geary

References

External links
 

1963 American television series debuts
1963 American television series endings
American television soap operas
NBC original programming
Television shows set in Rhode Island
English-language television shows
1960s American drama television series
1960s American legal television series